Hazel Carter may refer to:

 Hazel Carter (writer) (1980), model and writer
 Hazel Carter (linguist) (1999–2019), British-American linguist